Vahedin Ajeti (born December 30, 1960) is a former Yugoslav footballer.

Born in Titova Mitrovica, SAP Kosovo, SR Serbia, he played with several clubs in the Yugoslav First and Second leagues, namely, FK Trepča, KF Liria Prizren, FK Priština and FK Novi Pazar.

In 2018 he has been named chief scout of the Football Federation of Kosovo with main responsibility for the German-speaking regions in Europe.

References

1960 births
Living people
Sportspeople from Mitrovica, Kosovo
Yugoslav footballers
Kosovan footballers
FK Trepča players
FC Prishtina players
KF Liria players
FK Novi Pazar players
Yugoslav First League players
Association football midfielders